John S. Watson (born 1956) is an American businessman. He served as the chief executive officer and chairman of the board of the Chevron Corporation from January 1, 2010 to January 31, 2018.

Biography
John S. Watson was born in California in 1956. In 1978, he graduated with a B.A. in Agricultural Economics from the University of California, Davis, and in 1980 he received an MBA from the University of Chicago Booth School of Business.

In 1980, he joined the Chevron Corporation. He served as its chief financial officer from 2001 to 2005. From 2009 to 2010, he was Vice-chairman of the board. Since 2010, he has served as chairman and CEO.

He also serves as chairman of the board of the American Petroleum Institute, and on the board of directors of Caltex, Dynegy (2001–2004), the National Petroleum Council, the Business Council, the Business Roundtable, JPMorgan International Council, the American Society of Corporate Executives, and the Animal Rescue Foundation.

References

1956 births
Living people
University of California, Davis alumni
University of Chicago Booth School of Business alumni
American chief executives of energy companies
Chevron Corporation people
Directors of Chevron Corporation
People from San Ramon, California